James Clough (30 August 1918 – 2 September 1998) was an English professional footballer who played as a winger. He made a total of 163 appearances in the Football League for Southport, Crystal Palace, Southend United and Barrow, scoring 32 goals. He also played non-league football for Blyth Spartans.

Clough died in 1998 at the age of 80.

References

External links

1918 births
1998 deaths
English footballers
Footballers from Newcastle upon Tyne
Association football forwards
Southport F.C. players
Crystal Palace F.C. players
Southend United F.C. players
Barrow A.F.C. players
Blyth Spartans A.F.C. players
English Football League players